Ako Castuera is an American artist who is best known for being a writer and storyboard artist on the animated television series Adventure Time.

Early life
Castuera's father is from Mexico, and his ancestors originated from the Spanish city Castuera. Her mother is of Okinawan descent. According to an article published by the Smithsonian Asian Pacific American Center, she was "born at home in a commune to non-hippy parents."

History
Castuera graduated from the California College of the Arts, and it was at this university that she got involved with Giant Robot, a bi-monthly magazine of Asian and Asian American popular culture. After graduating, she moved to Los Angeles and eventually landed a job as a character designer on the Adult Swim series Metalocalypse after she drew a card for the series' lead character designer, Songgu Kwon. After an indie comic of hers was well received by Pendleton Ward, she was hired as a storyboard revisionist on the Cartoon Network series Adventure Time. She was eventually promoted to storyboard artist, and served in that position until she left in 2013 to focus fully on her art career. In October 2014, however, she returned to the series to temporarily storyboard several episodes during the show's seventh season, and during the show's eighth season, worked as a storyboard revisionist.

Accolades
At the inaugural Children's and Family Emmy Awards ceremony held in 2022, Castuera received an Emmy for "Outstanding Directing for an Animated Program" (alongside Luis Grane, Elizabeth Ito, Bob Logan, and Pendleton Ward).

Filmography

Television

References

External links

1978 births
Living people
California College of the Arts alumni
American artists
American television writers
American women television writers
American people of Okinawan descent
American artists of Asian descent
American people of Mexican descent
American storyboard artists
Emmy Award winners
21st-century American women